Magway is a UK e-commerce and freight delivery system that aims to transport goods in pods that fit in new and existing -diameter pipes, underground and overground, reducing road congestion and air pollution.

Founded in 2017 by Rupert Cruise, an engineer on Elon Musk's Hyperloop project, and Phill Davies, a business expert, Magway secured a £0.65 million grant in 2018, through Innovate UK’s 'Emerging and Enabling Technologies' competition, to develop an operational demonstrator. In 2019, £1.58 million was raised through crowdfunding to fund a pilot scheme, and in 2020, Magway was awarded £1.9 million from the UK Government's 'Driving the Electric Revolution Challenge', an initiative launched to coincide with the first meeting of a new Cabinet committee focused on climate change. In September 2020, Magway completed its first full loop of test track in a warehouse in Wembley. 

Primarily focused on two freight routes from large consolidation centres near London (Milton Keynes, Buckinghamshire and Hatfield, Hertfordshire) into Park Royal, a west London distribution centre, future plans involve installing  of track in decommissioned London gas pipelines, to deliver e-commerce goods from distribution centres direct to consumers in the capital.

References 

Sustainable transport
Transport systems
Emerging technologies
Linear induction motors
Vacuum systems